Sha Mahmood Noor Zahi (21 March 1991) is an Afghan sprinter.

After getting an Olympic Scholarship, Noor Zahi has been selected by World Athletics on an universality place to represent Afghanistan at the 2020 Summer Games in Tokyo.
He run the men's 100 metres' preliminary round after staying in Omuta.
Sha Mahmood ran 100m in Tokyo 2020 Olympic in 11.04 s.  After Taliban attack and occupation of Afghanistan, He came to Iran as an refugee and Iran NOC supported him and provide him accommodation, training facilities and a experienced Coach. Then after 8 mounts of training under supervision of coach Mahdi Cheraghi (instagram:@mahdicheraghi), Sha Mahmood ran 10.73 in Iran national track and field competitions and broke his personal Olympic record. These days he is training with his Iranian Coach Mahdi Cheraghi to prepare for the 2021 Islamic Solidarity Games in Konya, Turkey.

References

1991 births
Living people
Afghan male sprinters
Olympic athletes of Afghanistan
Athletes (track and field) at the 2020 Summer Olympics
Olympic male sprinters